The Heath School is a coeducational secondary school located in Runcorn in the English county of Cheshire

Formerly a community school administered by Halton Borough Council, the school converted to academy status in September 2012. It continues to coordinate with the council for admissions. In April 2016, planning permission was sought for a complete rebuild of the school on the same site. The work was completed in January 2018.

The Heath School offers GCSEs and BTECs as programmes of study for pupils.

References

External links
The Heath School official website

Runcorn
Secondary schools in the Borough of Halton
Academies in the Borough of Halton